Craig House or Craig Farm may refer to:

Places

United Kingdom
Craig House, Edinburgh
Craighouse, Jura, Argyll and Bute, Scotland

United States
Craig House (New Jersey), Freehold, NJ, on the grounds of Monmouth Battlefield State Park
Craig-Bryan House, Bentonville, AR, listed on the NRHP in Arkansas
Craig Mansion, Phoenix, AZ, listed on the NRHP in Arizona
Robert Craig Plantation, Lawrenceville, GA, listed on the NRHP in Georgia
William Houston Craig House, Noblesville, IN, listed on the NRHP in Indiana
Spears-Craig House, Danville, KY, listed on the NRHP in Kentucky
Newton Craig House and Penitentiary Buildings Complex, Georgetown, KY, listed on the NRHP in Kentucky
Craig-Flowers House, Vicksburg, MS, listed on the NRHP in Mississippi
Craig-Seay House, Como, MS, listed on the NRHP in Mississippi
Craig Farmstead, Gastonia, NC, listed on the NRHP in North Carolina
Reinhardt-Craig House, Kiln and Pottery Shop, Vale, NC, listed on the NRHP in North Carolina
Craig House (Lancaster, South Carolina), listed on the NRHP in South Carolina
Mrs. Edward B. Craig House, Forest Hills, TN, listed on the NRHP in Tennessee
Craig-Beasley House, Franklin, TN, listed on the NRHP in Tennessee
Craig Family Farm, Linden, TN, listed on the NRHP in Tennessee
Heard-Craig House, McKinney, TX, listed on the NRHP in Texas
Payne-Craig House, Janesville, WI, listed on the NRHP in Wisconsin

People
Craig House (baseball) (born 1977), former pitcher in Major League Baseball